Estadio Claudio "Chiqui" Tapia is a stadium located in the Barracas neighborhood of Buenos Aires, Argentina. The stadium has a capacity of 4,400 spectators, and is the home ground of club Barracas Central.

History 
Inaugurated in 1916, the stadium was initially called Estadio Olavarría y Luna, being renamed to Estadio Claudio Fabián Tapia in 2008, as an honour to "Chiqui" Tapia, who was the president of the club at that time. Tapia had been also player of the club.

The stadium its original structure of wooden grandstands until 1970, when the club replaced them by cement stands, also removing the roof in the official grandstand. In 2006, a new grandstand for visitors was inaugurated on one of the sides. Five years later, eight press boxes were inaugurated. The royal boxes were named "Julio Grondona" and "Hugo Moyano" (then president of Club Atlético Independiente and father in love of Tapia).

After Barracas Central promoted to Primera División in 2021 after beating Quilmes on penalties, the team had to play their home matches in other stadiums so Barracas venue did not meet security requirements that the Argentine Football Association demanded. Nevertheless, in August 2022 AFA lifted the restrictions, allowing the stadium to be used.

See also
 List of football stadiums in Argentina

References

Claudio Chiqui Tapia
Claudio Chiqui Tapia
Barracas Central